Deh-e Seyf (also Romanized as Deh Saif and Deh Seyf; also known as Seyf) is a village in Takab Rural District, Shahdad District, Kerman County, Kerman Province, Iran. At the 2006 census, its population was 110, in 23 families.

References 

Populated places in Kerman County